Jean Joseph Marie Amiot (February 8, 1718October 8, 1793) was a French Jesuit priest who worked in Qing China, during the reign of the Qianlong Emperor.

Born in Toulon, Amiot entered the novitiate of the Society of Jesus at the age of 19. After he was ordained in 1746, he aspired to serve in an overseas mission. He was assigned a mission in China and left France in 1749. He arrived at Beijing in 1751 and remained there for the rest of his life.

Amiot served as an intermediary between the academics of Europe and China. His correspondence provided insight on the culture of China to Europe. He translated Chinese works into French. His translation of Sun Tzu's The Art of War is the first translation of the work into a Western language.

Early life 
Amiot was born in Toulon on February 8, 1718 to Louis Amiot, the royal notary of Toulon, and Marie-Anne Serre. He was the eldest of ten children: five boys and five girls. His brother Pierre-Jules-Roch Amiot would go on to become the lieutenant-general of the admiralty of Toulon. His sister, Marguerite-Claire was an Ursuline sister. Amiot maintained contact with both.

After finishing his studies in philosophy and theology at the Jesuit seminary in Toulon, Amiot entered the novitiate of the Society of Jesus in Avignon on September 27, 1737. He remained a novice for two years. Afterwards, he taught at the Jesuit colleges of Besançon, Arles, Aix-en-Provence and finally at Nîmes, where he was professor of rhetoric in the academic year of 1744–1745. He completed his theological studies at Dôle from 1745 to 1748. He was ordained as a priest on December 22, 1746.

Arrival at China 
Amiot requested Franz Retz, the Superior General of the Society of Jesus at that time, to serve in an overseas mission. He was given a mission to China. In a letter to his brother, he had expressed his desire to serve in a mission to China. He left France in 1749, accompanied by Chinese Jesuits Paul Liu and Stanislas Kang, who were sent to study in France and were returning to their home country. Kang died at sea, before the party could reach China.

They arrived at Macau on July 27, 1750. The Jesuits of Beijing announced Amiot's arrival, along with Portuguese Jesuits José d'Espinha and Emmanuel de Mattos to Emperor Qianlong, who ordered that they be taken to the capital. On March 28, 1751, they left Macau for Guangzhou and arrived five days later. They left Canton on June 2, and arrived at Beijing on August 22.

After his arrival, he was put in charge of the children's congregation of the Holy Guardian Angels. Alongside this, he studied the Chinese language. He adopted the Chinese name Qian Deming and wore Chinese clothing in order to adapt himself to Chinese culture. In 1754, Amiot made a young Chinese man by the name of Yang Ya-Ko-Pe his assistant. Amiot instructed him in the European manner. Yang died in 1784, after working with Amiot for over thirty years.

Suppression of the Jesuits 
In 1762 the Parliament of Paris ordered the suppression of the Society of Jesus and the confiscation of its property. The society was abolished in France two years later, confirmed by King Louis XV. The Jesuit mission in China survived for a while after their suppression, being protected by the Qianlong Emperor himself. The final blow, however, would be Pope Clement XIV's brief, Dominus ac Redemptor. The brief reached the French Jesuits in China on September 22, 1775. A German Carmelite named Joseph de Sainte-Thérèse brought the legal brief to the Jesuits. The Jesuits of Beijing surrendered to the brief, resigned from the Society of Jesus and became secular priests. Wishing to keep the French mission alive, King Louis XVI sent financial aid to the mission and appointed François Bourgeois as the administrator of the French mission. Amiot was named as Bourgeois' replacement.

Amiot turned his attention to writing. He maintained contact with Henri Bertin, the foreign minister of France. He also corresponded with other European Academies, including brief contacts with the Imperial Academy of Sciences and the Royal Society.

Later life and death 
Amiot's health gradually worsened; the development of the French revolution distressed him. He was too ill to meet George Macartney's embassy. Instead, he sent Macartney his portrait and a letter. On October 8, 1793, the news of King Louis XVI's death reached Amiot. He celebrated Mass for the deceased king and visited the tombs of the Jesuits. He died on that same night.

Works 

In 1772 Amiot's translation of Sun Tzu's The Art of War was published. It includes a translation of the Yongzheng Emperor's Ten Precepts. This translation is the first translation of The Art of War in the West. The next translation of the work in a Western language would not be made until Everard Calthrop published his translation of the work in English in 1905.

Amiot sent his translation of Li Guangdi's Guyue Jingzhuan to Paris in 1754. He later acknowledged  that the translation contained errors and was incomplete. The translation was referenced by Jean-Philippe Rameau it in his treatises. Amiot's own work on Chinese music,  was published twice by Pierre-Joseph Roussier in 1779 and 1780. Amiot's supplements to the work were not published until 1997. Amiot also sent collections of Chinese music and instruments to France. In 1777, he sent a Sheng, which contributed to the development of the harmonica in Europe.

Amiot could play the harpsichord and the flute. He tried to win over Chinese listeners by playing pieces by French baroque composers, including Rameau's Les sauvages and Les cyclopes. These attempts were not successful. When Amiot asked the Chinese musicians for their opinions, they remarked that "your music was not made for our ears, nor our ears for your music". Lester Hu, assistant professor of musicology at the University of California, Berkeley has doubted the veracity of this story.

Amiot could speak in Manchu, the language of the emperor. He wrote a Manchu-French dictionary, which was published from 1789 to 1790 with the help of Bertin. Prince Hongwu, a member of the Qing imperial family, praised the dictionary. Amiot also wrote a Manchu grammar, which was never published.

Amiot carried out scientific observations and experiments while working in China. He made a record of the weather in Beijing, which was published by Charles Messier in 1774. Amiot tried to build a hot air balloon, but he was discouraged by Prince Hongwu, for fear of disseminating the discovery.

Notes

References 

1718 births
1793 deaths
18th-century French Jesuits
Linguists from France
French sinologists
French Roman Catholic missionaries
Jesuit missionaries in China
Manchurologists
People from Toulon
Roman Catholic missionaries in China
French expatriates in China
Missionary linguists
Qianlong Emperor